Ivan Živanović (born 10 December 1981) is a Serbian former football defender. 

Živanović made one appearance in the Coppa Italia while playing for Sampdoria in the 2006–07 season.

Career statistics

External links

 

1981 births
Living people
Sportspeople from Šabac
Serbian footballers
Serbian expatriate footballers
Association football defenders
FK Mačva Šabac players
FK Smederevo players
U.C. Sampdoria players
FC Rostov players
Russian Premier League players
Expatriate footballers in Italy
Expatriate footballers in Russia